Allocotesia is a monotypic moth genus in the family Geometridae. Its only species is Allocotesia chiphora. Both the genus and species were described by Wehrli in 1936.

References

Ennominae
Geometridae genera
Monotypic moth genera